Yoshihiko Hara (born 11 February 1964) is a Japanese wrestler. He competed at the 1988 Summer Olympics and the 1992 Summer Olympics.

References

1964 births
Living people
Japanese male sport wrestlers
Olympic wrestlers of Japan
Wrestlers at the 1988 Summer Olympics
Wrestlers at the 1992 Summer Olympics
People from Niigata (city)
Wrestlers at the 1990 Asian Games
Asian Games competitors for Japan
Asian Wrestling Championships medalists
20th-century Japanese people